"Please Don't Go" is a song by Boyz II Men from their album Cooleyhighharmony. It reached number 49 on the US Billboard Hot 100 in 1992 and number three on the New Zealand Singles Chart in 1993.

Track listing
US promo CD
 "Please Don't Go" (radio edit) – 4:07 	
 "Please Don't Go" (LP version) – 4:28 	
 "Please Don't Go" (instrumental version) – 4:28

Charts

Weekly charts

Year-end charts

References

1990 songs
1992 singles
Boyz II Men songs
Motown singles
Pop ballads
Song recordings produced by Dallas Austin
Songs written by Nathan Morris